Owen Jenkins (born 20 July 1993) is a Welsh rugby union player who plays as a hooker for Wales Sevens. He was a Wales under-20 international and also played for Cardiff Blues and the Dragons. He is the son of former Wales hooker Garin Jenkins.

Jenkins made his professional debut in 2013 having previously played for the academy team and Pontypridd RFC. He competed for Wales at the 2022 Rugby World Cup Sevens in Cape Town.

Jenkins joined the Dragons in 2019. In 2020, Jenkins signed a long term contract with the Dragons. He departed the club at the end of the 2021–22 United Rugby Championship season.

References

External links 
Cardiff Blues Player Profile

1993 births
Living people
Cardiff Rugby players
Rugby union players from Ynysybwl
Welsh rugby union players
Dragons RFC players
Rugby union wings
Rugby sevens players at the 2022 Commonwealth Games